The Metropolitan Subdivision is a railroad line owned and operated by CSX Transportation in the District of Columbia and the U.S. state of Maryland. The 79-mile line runs from Washington, D.C., northwest to Weverton, Maryland, along the former Metropolitan Branch of the Baltimore and Ohio Railroad.

At its southeast end, north of Union Station, the Metropolitan Subdivision meets the Capital Subdivision (formerly called the B&O Washington Branch) and Amtrak's Northeast Corridor. It meets the Old Main Line Subdivision at Point of Rocks, Maryland. At its northwest end in Weverton, the line joins the Cumberland Subdivision.

MARC Train's Brunswick Line uses the entire subdivision, as does Amtrak's Capitol Limited. The Red Line of the Washington Metro shares right-of-way with the subdivision along two separate stretches in Maryland and D.C.: from the junction with the Capital Subdivision to north of Silver Spring, and from south of Twinbrook to the end of the Red Line at Shady Grove.

History
Interest in building a new rail line from Washington to points west was initially generated by businessmen in Washington and Montgomery County, Maryland. In 1853 they obtained a corporate charter from the Maryland General Assembly to form the Metropolitan Railroad. The proposed line would run from Washington to the vicinity of Frederick, Maryland, where it would connect with the B&O main line, and continue to Hagerstown, Maryland. The company conducted some initial land surveys, but had difficulty raising funds and went bankrupt in 1863. 

Two years later, the expired charter was taken over by the B&O, which had not previously been interested in building a new route out of Washington. Construction began in 1866 along a slightly different route, connecting with the main line at Point of Rocks, Maryland.

The line opened on April 30, 1873, as the B&O's Metropolitan Branch. The new line became the B&O's main passenger route to Washington, with the Old Main Line, from Point of Rocks to Relay, reduced to secondary status. Some through freight trains were also rerouted to the new line.

Increasing congestion led the B&O to start adding double track portions to the line in 1886. The Washington-to-Gaithersburg section was double-tracked by 1893. During the peak years of passenger operation, 1893 to the 1920s, the line saw 18 trains per day, with as many as 28 stops along the Met Branch.

Double-tracking was completed on the remainder of the branch in 1928. Several distinctive passenger stations, designed by architect Ephraim Francis Baldwin, were constructed along the line.  Original stations still stand at Rockville (moved away from the tracks in 1981), Kensington, Gaithersburg, Dickerson, and Point of Rocks.

In 1906, a rear collision at Terra Cotta station killed 53 people.

On February 16, 1996, the collision of two trains in Silver Spring killed three crew members and eight passengers and injured a total of 26 people.

Georgetown Branch

The Georgetown Branch ran from a junction north of the Silver Spring station in a broad 11-mile arc to the Georgetown area of Washington, D.C. The branch was built between 1892 and 1910. It was originally intended to be a B&O extension that would cross the Potomac River near the Chain Bridge, but in 1904, the B&O reached an agreement with the Pennsylvania Railroad to use the Long Bridge over the Potomac, nearly six miles downstream. So the B&O used the Georgetown Branch as a spur to serve local industries in Silver Spring, Chevy Chase, Bethesda, and Georgetown. Engineering features that were built on the branch included the Rock Creek Trestle in Chevy Chase, the Dalecarlia Tunnel, and a through-truss bridge over the Chesapeake and Ohio Canal.

CSX abandoned the Georgetown Branch in 1986, with the last train running in June 1985, and the spur is now accessible to the public as the Capital Crescent Trail. The Bethesda-to-Silver Spring portion of the spur is also providing a right-of-way for the Purple Line light rail system, which has been under construction since 2017. The Rock Creek trestle was demolished and is being replaced by new bridges to support the light rail tracks and the bicycle trail.

Current operation

Through mergers, the line became part of the CSX system in 1987. CSX organized its Metropolitan Subdivision as a combination of the original B&O Met Branch plus a section of the B&O original main line northwest of Point of Rocks, which had opened in 1834. The entire subdivision is signaled for bi-directional running. There is a spur that services the Dickerson Generating Station (formerly owned by the Potomac Electric Power Company (PEPCO)) at Dickerson, and a trash-transfer facility spur at Derwood.  The interlockings on the line are (east to west): F Tower, QN Tower, Georgetown Jct, Montrose, Derwood, Cloppers, Buck Lodge, Dickerson, PEPCO, Tuscarora, East Rocks, Point of Rocks, East Brunswick, WB Tower and Weverton.

Engineering features 
The line's bridges cross:
Tuscarora Creek. Originally a Bollman truss iron bridge, replaced with a girder bridge in 1904.
Monocacy River. Originally a  Bollman truss, replaced with a seven-span girder bridge in 1904.
Little Monocacy River. Originally a 500-foot wood trestle, replaced by a 331-foot stone arch viaduct in 1906.
Great Seneca Creek (Waring Viaduct). Originally a  wood and iron trestle, replaced with an arch stone viaduct in 1906.
Little Seneca Creek. Originally a timber bridge, replaced with a steel trestle in 1896, and then a concrete arch in 1928.
Rock Creek. The original bridge consisted of four 100-ft Bollman trusses. In 1893, the main course of Rock Creek was diverted primarily upstream of the bridge. Before the diversion, a loop in the creek caused it to run almost parallel to the bridge. The realignment allowed the tracks to cross Rock Creek at a right angle.  The Bollman trusses were replaced by a stone arch bridge from 1893-1896.

See also
List of CSX Transportation lines

References

External links

The Georgetown Branch - History and photos

CSX Transportation lines
Rail infrastructure in Washington, D.C.
Rail infrastructure in Maryland
Baltimore and Ohio Railroad lines